In France, Communautés d’Universités et Établissements (COMUEs, Communities of universities and institutions) are groups of universities and higher education institutions. A COMUE is a form of Établissement Public à caractère Scientifique, Culturel et Professionnel (EPCSP). 

These organizations were created with the Law on Higher Education and Research (France) of July 2013. It replaced the previous structure, the Pôle de recherche et d'enseignement supérieur (PRES), that existed from 2007 to 2013. Unlike the former PRES, they are able to award degrees, and have program budgets.

References

See also
 Liberties and Responsibilities of Universities (2013 French law)
 
 Franco-German University (an international cooperation project with universities in Germany)

 
Grands établissements
2013 in education
Organizations established in 2013
2013 establishments in France

2007 in education
2007 establishments in France
2013 disestablishments in France